Jack Lloyd Wilkinson (born 12 September 1985) is an English footballer who played in the Football League for Hartlepool United.

Wilkinson managed to break into the reserve team at Hartlepool United and went out on loan to Scarborough, Whitby and Bishop Auckland in order to gain match practice. Jack who was the first of the two to break in the first team when he was rewarded by manager Neale Cooper for his performances. In 2003, Jack made his first team debut against his former loanee club Whitby in the FA Cup. Jack went on to make a total of 2 starts and 2 substitute appearances for the first team, scoring twice. Unfortunately in 2004, Jack picked up an injury and was out for three months. During this time Jack was over-taken in the pecking order for strikers and this led to him being released from the club in May, 2006.

After being released by Hartlepool, Wilkinson had a trial with York City.

Wilkinson signed for Bridlington Town following his release from 'Pool. He later quit the sport citing disillusionment with football.

Jack Wilkinson now plays for telegraph fc in Bridlington who are currently 8th in the hull county premier league.He has scored 4 goals in 14 appearances.

Notes

External links

Jack Wikinson's Official Hartlepool United profile
Jack Wilkinson's PoolsOnline.tk profile

1985 births
Living people
Sportspeople from Beverley
Footballers from the East Riding of Yorkshire
English footballers
Association football forwards
Hartlepool United F.C. players
Whitby Town F.C. players
Scarborough F.C. players
Bishop Auckland F.C. players
Bridlington Town A.F.C. players